Henstead with Hulver Street is a civil parish in the East Suffolk district of the English county of Suffolk. It borders the parishes of Benacre, Ellough, Gisleham, Kessingland, Mutford, Rushmere, Sotterley and Wrentham.

At the 2011 United Kingdom census the parish had a population of 408, having increased from a mid 2005 estimate of 320. A 2016 estimate suggested that the population had risen slightly to 416.

The main A12 road cuts across the eastern border of the parish, with the B1127 Beccles to Benacre road running through Hulver Street and past Henstead church. The Hundred River defines much of the northern border of the parish, with the western boundary bordered by the Sotterley estate.

Notes

References 

Civil parishes in Suffolk
Waveney District